Dhurgham Mahdi (born 1 July 1951) is a former Iraqi football midfielder  who played for Iraq at the 1978 Asian Games. 

Mahdi played for Iraq between 1974 and 1980.

References

Iraqi footballers
Iraq international footballers
Living people
Footballers at the 1978 Asian Games
Association football midfielders
1951 births
Asian Games competitors for Iraq